Piteå Elit is a cross-country skiing club from Piteå in northern Sweden. In the 2011-12 season, three skiers represented Sweden internationally. The club also has many skiers now skiing on the national level.

The club had two skiers, Magdalena Pajala and Jesper Modin, competing in the 2010 Winter Olympics for Sweden. Former skier Magnus Ingesson from the club was the head coach for the Swedish cross-country skiing team in the 2010 Winter Olympics.

On May 6, 2012, Charlotte Kalla joined Piteå Elit, for which she would compete starting with the 2012/13 season.

Current skiers
Charlotte Kalla
Mia Eriksson
Magdalena Pajala
Jennie Öberg
Emma Sjölander
Ebba Andersson
Johan Westerlund
Mikael Norberg
Jesper Modin
Karl Edenroth
Mikael Norberg
Martin Bergström

Former skiers
Lina Andersson MedalGold  2006 Turin cross-country skiing at the 2006 Winter Olympics Team sprint, MedalSilver 2005 Oberstdorf Individual sprint, MedalSilver 2009 Liberec cross-country skiing at the FIS Nordic World Ski Championships 2009 Team sprint, MedalBronze 2009 Liberec cross-country skiing at the 4 x 5 km.
David Flinkfeldt
Emma Lundbäck
Susanne Nyström
Karolina Skoog
Kina Swidén
Niklas Jonsson won the silver medal in the 50 km at the 1998 Winter Olympics in Nagano.
Urban Lindgren earned a silver medal in the 4 x 10 km at the 2001 FIS Nordic World Ski Championships in Lahti.
Magnus Ingesson earned a silver medal in the 4 x 10 km at the 2001 FIS Nordic World Ski Championships in Lahti.
Emelie Öhrstig won gold medal in sprint at the 2005 FIS Nordic World Ski Championships in Oberstdorf.
Larry Poromaa
Lars Öberg

References

External links
Piteå Elit's homepage http://www.piteaelit.se/

Sport in Norrbotten County